Ogun State is one of the 36 States of Nigeria with Abeokuta as the state capital.  This list of tertiary institutions in Ogun State includes universities, polytechnics and colleges.

List
Babcock University, Ilisan Remo
 Bells University of Technology, Ota
 Chrisland University, Abeokuta
 Covenant University, Ota
 Crawford University, Igbesa
 Crescent University, Abeokuta
 Federal Polytechnic, Ilaro
 Federal University of Agriculture, Abeokuta
McPherson University, Seriki-Sotayo
 Moshood Abiola Polytechnic
 Mountain Top University, Lagos-Ibadan Expressway, Nigeria
 Olabisi Onabanjo University
 Tai Solarin University of Education

Abraham Adesanya Polytechnic
Adetokunbo University, Sagamu
Allover Central Polytechnic, Otta.
D S Adegbenro I.C.T Polytechnic, Itori Ewekoro.
Federal College Of Education, Osiele
 Gateway Polytechnic Saapade
Hallmark university. Ijebu itele
National Open Univerty Of Nigeria
Ogun state institute of technology, igbesa
Redeemer’s College of Technology and Management, (RECTEM) Redemption camp, Mowe, Ogun State
Southwestern University
Tai Solarin College of Education(TASCE), Omu, Ijebu Ode
Trinity University

References

Ogun